Serra d'En Galceran is a mountain range of the Valencian Community, Spain.

Geography
The main peaks of the range are the 1,078 m high Tossal de la Vila, Penya Blanca (951 m) and Tossal de la Toiola (939 m). This range is one of the most important areas in Europe where there are still pristine woods and thickets of Phoenician juniper, sometimes mixed with Kermes oak. The Spanish Ibex is abundant in the range.

The towns of La Serra d'en Galceran and La Sarratella are located within the mountain range, the former one giving it its name.
Parts of this mountain range fall also within the Albocàsser, Les Coves de Vinromà, la Torre d'en Doménec, Vilanova d'Alcolea, Bell-lloc and La Vall d'Alba municipal terms.

See also
Mountains of the Valencian Community

References

External links 

Sarratella Town Hall

Plana Alta
En Galceran